RAF Castle Camps was listed as being in Cambridgeshire as it is close to its namesake Cambridgeshire village. It is very near the Suffolk border and the airfield straddled the Essex and Cambridgeshire county border. Construction of the station was started in September 1939. It opened as a satellite of RAF Debden in June 1940 and became a satellite of RAF North Weald in July 1943.

During the Battle of Britain, one of the units operating from Castle Camps was 85 Squadron, whose Hawker Hurricanes were commanded by Peter Townsend.

The airfield was used by numerous squadrons throughout the Second World War. In 1945, it was commanded by Battle of Britain ace Tim Vigors. It closed in January 1946.

Operational Units and Aircraft

The following units were also here at some point:
 No. 25 (Base) Defence Wing RAF (March – May 1944)
 No. 85 Group Communication Squadron RAF (May – June 1944)
 No. 149 Airfield RAF (March – April 1944)
 No. 2771 Squadron RAF Regiment
 No. 2887 Squadron RAF Regiment

Current use
The site has reverted to agricultural use. However the outlines of portions of the runways in the fields (when viewed on Google Earth), can still be seen and some of the perimeter roads are even now in use as farm tracks.

Some of the airfield buildings are still present and being used by local farms and industry.

References

Citations

Bibliography
Brazier, Roy (2011) History of RAF Castle Camps: a Unique Airfield, 1940–47.

External links 

Castle Camps Village, Airfield webpage
Hawker Tempest Page: History Hawker Tempest at RAF Castle Camps
605 Squadron Website: History of 605 Squadron
Polish Squadrons Remembered: No. 307 Squadron History

Royal Air Force stations in Cambridgeshire
Royal Air Force stations in Essex
Royal Air Force stations of World War II in the United Kingdom